North County Correctional Facility (NCCF) is a Los Angeles County jail, run by the Los Angeles County Sheriff's Department.

The facility's construction began in 1985, and it was formally dedicated on March 1, 1990 by then Sheriff, Sherman Block, and the President of the United States, George H. W. Bush. NCCF consists of five jails within the same facility, and it has an inmate population of about 3,800. It can provide for disciplinary segregation and clinic-level medical treatment.

The facility is commonly referred to as the "Flagship"; it was designed and constructed to be cost-efficient with regard to the ratio of staff members to inmates and vocational productivity. NCCF has a ratio of ten inmates to each staff member. The facility features educational, vocational and counseling programs. These programs have been designed to assist the facility's inmates in becoming self-sufficient within the law.

2006 riot 
On Saturday, February 4, 2006, a prison riot at the facility injured over 100 inmates. Nine inmates were critically injured, and eight had minor injuries. One inmate was pronounced dead at the scene. Numerous ambulances were summoned to the remote facility after fighting began and custody personnel deployed tear gas to quell the disturbance.  No law enforcement personnel were injured in the riot. According to deputies, the four-hour riot was sparked by racial tensions generated outside the prison between Mexican and African-American gang members.  In retribution for a conflict between these gangs and in a show of the reach of their power, Mexican gang leaders had successfully  ordered Mexican prisoners within the NCCF compound to drop furniture items from several stories above onto unsuspecting African-American prisoners below, with whom they had no personal differences.

On Wednesday, April 28, 2010, two inmates, Jose Baldeno and Winder Barrios, were discovered missing during a 3:15 a.m. headcount. The two were captured several hours later.

References

External links
Los Angeles County Sheriff's Department's information about the North County Correctional Facility
Instructions for Visiting Inmates at NCCF and Visiting Hours
Los Angeles County - Pitchess Detention Center, North Facility
Boston Globe article about the 2006 riot at NCCF
Authorities hunt for two escapees from Castaic jail; officials say they faced prison time in armed-robbery case

Buildings and structures in Los Angeles County, California
Los Angeles County Sheriff's Department
Prisons in California
2006 riots
Prison uprisings in the United States
1990 establishments in California